Trailer Nos. 60 of the Manx Electric Railway on the Isle of Man, was built as a one-off order in 1896.

This trailer has chilled iron wheels making it unique among the fleet; when rounding tight radius curves of which there are many on the line, its wheels make a distinctive shrill ringing noise.  It is painted in the short-lived 1957 nationalisation livery of green and white and usually hauled by similarly treated open car No. 16.

References

Sources
 Manx Manx Electric Railway Fleetlist (2002) Manx Electric Railway Society
 Island Island Images: Manx Electric Railway Pages (2003) Jon Wornham
 Official Official Tourist Department Page (2009) Isle Of Man Heritage Railways

Manx Electric Railway